FUHS may refer to:
 Fairfield Union High School, Lancaster, Ohio, United States
 Fallbrook Union High School, Fallbrook, California, United States
 Fullerton Union High School, Fullerton, California, United States
 Finch University of Health Sciences, former name of Rosalind Franklin University of Medicine and Science